"Rockstar" is a song by American rapper Bizarre from his debut solo studio album Hannicap Circus. It was released on May 24, 2005 via Sanctuary Urban as the album's lead single.

Written by Bizarre, Eminem and Luis Resto, the song was produced by Eminem with Resto's additional production. Recording sessions took place at 54 Sound in Detroit with Mike Strange and Tony Campagna. Audio mixing was handled by Eminem and Steve King.

The song continues on the plot from the D12 single "My Band", focusing on Bizarre leaving D12 to make a successful solo career. The music video shows the truth however, as there are no fans in the audience when Bizarre raps "I'm on stage with thousands of fans". Bizarre's slob, pervert, and violent image are also promoted, with a messy room, "girls thirteen to eighteen," and punching a waitress. AllMusic reviewer David Jeffries calls the song "an equally infectious and herky-jerky sequel" to "My Band".

Music video
The music video for "Rockstar" starts in a room with women's underwear dropped in all the room, and Bizarre sleeping in a bed, then Bizarre gets up and starts to rap, suddenly appears in front of giant letters which say "BIZARRE" in red color, and then walks in the streets, then appears live in a concert on a stage with blue chairs but there is nobody at the concert, appears dancing with people dressed like rabbits, suddenly appears on a motorcycle with a girl, later appears women with bikinis who jump into a pool, Eminem and D12 make cameo appearances, disturbing Bizarre, the music video was filmed in Detroit.

Live Performances

"Rockstar" has only had one live performance, that being on the Live from New York City concert film, a part of the Anger Management Tour. After D12 (sans Bizarre) stop performing the song How Come, the group ask where Bizarre is. Bizarre then tells the group to get off of the stage. He then performs the first two hooks and the first verse.

Track listing

Personnel
Rufus Arthur Johnson – songwriter, vocals
Marshall Bruce Mathers III – songwriter, producer, mixing
Luis Edgardo Resto – songwriter, keyboards, additional producer
Michael Strange – recording
Tony Campana – recording
Steven King – mixing

Charts

References

External links

2005 songs
2005 singles
American hip hop songs
Songs written by Eminem
Song recordings produced by Eminem
Songs written by Luis Resto (musician)
Songs written by Bizarre (rapper)